Greg Zito (born March 7, 1953) is an American businessman, lobbyist, and politician who served as a member of the Illinois General Assembly.

Early life and education 
Born in Oak Park, Illinois, Zito attended Triton College. He then received his bachelor's degree in politician science and public administration from Illinois State University.

Career 
Zito served in the Illinois House of Representatives from 1981 to 1983 and the Illinois Senate from 1983 to 1991. After leaving office, Zito was succeeded by William E. Peterson. Zito is a Democrat.

After leaving the Illinois Senate in 1991, Zito began working as a lobbyist for Household Finance Group Ltd. Zito later became the sales director for RedSpeed, a British organization that manufactured red light cameras.

In 1994 and 1995, Zito was investigated for allegedly using leftover campaign funds to pay himself a salary and purchase a home in Wayne, Illinois.

Personal life 
In 2018, Zito's son, Nic Zito, was an unsuccessful candidate for District 49 in the Illinois House of Representatives.

Notes

1953 births
Living people
20th-century American politicians
People from Oak Park, Illinois
Triton College alumni
Illinois State University alumni
Democratic Party Illinois state senators
Democratic Party members of the Illinois House of Representatives